Elena Tsunaeva (born 13 January 1969, Volgograd) is a Russian political figure and a deputy of the 8th State Duma.

Biography 
In 2010, Tsunaeva was granted a Candidate of Sciences in History degree. For 18 years, from 1992 to 2010, she worked as a teacher at schools and institutes of the Volgograd Oblast. Starting from the 1980-s she has been engaged in field search expeditions to search for and reburial the remains of Soviet soldiers. Tsunaeva even co-founded the Volgograd public organization titled "Poisk". In 2000, she became a researcher at the Research Institute for Problems of the Economic History of Russia in the 20th Century of the Volgograd State University. In 2015, she joined the organizational committee of the Immortal Regiment movement. In 2017, she became a member of the Civic Chamber of the Russian Federation. On 29 November 2018 she was elected one of five co-chairs of the All-Russia People's Front. Since September 2021, she has served as deputy of the 8th State Duma.

References
 

 

1959 births
Living people
United Russia politicians
21st-century Russian politicians
21st-century Russian women politicians
Eighth convocation members of the State Duma (Russian Federation)